Higgons is a surname. Notable people with the surname include:

Bevil Higgons (1670–1735), English historian and poet
Thomas Higgons (1624–1691), English diplomat and politician
Theophilus Higgons (1578–1659), English divine

See also
Higgins (surname)